Frank House, Franks House, or Franke House may refer to:

People
Frank House (baseball) (1930–2005), American Major League player
Frank House (footballer) (1884–1963), Australian rules footballer

Places

Netherlands 
Anne Frank House, museum dedicated to Anne Frank

United States 
The Alan I W Frank House, Pittsburgh, Pennsylvania, historic Gropius-Breuer masterwork
Anderson–Frank House, historic home in Tampa, Florida, listed on the NRHP in Florida
George W. Frank House, historic mansion in Kearney, Nebraska
John Frank House, in Sapulpa, Oklahoma
M. Lloyd Frank Estate, in Portland, Oregon
Frank House (Maryville, Missouri), listed on the NRHP in Missouri
Charles Frank House and Store, Valley City, OH, listed on the NRHP in Ohio
Joseph M. Frank House, Little Rock, AR, listed on the NRHP in Arkansas
Charles Franks House, Lanark, IL, listed on the NRHP in Illinois
C. F. Franke House, Mason City, IA, listed on the NRHP in Iowa
Henry Frank House, Middletown, KY, listed on the NRHP in Kentucky
Henry Franks House, Allegan, MI, listed on the NRHP in Michigan
Case Study House #25, Long Beach, California

UK 
Franks House, East London, part of the British Museum, used for the storage and study of their Early Prehistory collections

House, Frank